Monardella viridis is an uncommon species of flowering plant in the mint family which is endemic to California.

Distribution
The plant has a disjunct distribution, its two subspecies separated by several hundred miles. The green monardella, ssp. viridis, is limited to the North Coast Ranges north of the San Francisco Bay Area, while the rock monardella, ssp. saxicola, is endemic to the San Gabriel Mountains of the Los Angeles Area.

Description
In general, Monardella viridis is a perennial herb producing a hairy erect or decumbent stem lined with pairs of oval leaves with woolly undersides. The inflorescence is a head of several flowers blooming in a small cup of rough-haired, leaflike bracts. The light pink or purple flowers are between 1 and 2 centimeters long.

External links
 Jepson Manual Treatment - Monardella viridis
 USDA Plants Profile: Monardella viridis
 Monardella viridis - Photo gallery

viridis
Endemic flora of California
Natural history of the California chaparral and woodlands
Natural history of the California Coast Ranges
Natural history of the Transverse Ranges
~
Taxa named by Willis Linn Jepson
Flora without expected TNC conservation status